Wayne High School is a public high school in Fort Wayne Community Schools, located in the southern suburbs of Fort Wayne, Indiana, United States.

Notable alumni 

Joe Andrew, National Chairman of the Democratic National Committee (DNC) from 1999–2001
Jason Baker, professional football punter, NFL Carolina Panthers
Roosevelt Barnes, former professional football player, NFL Detroit Lions
Molly Hagan, actress
Michael Derrick Hudson (Class of 1982), poet and librarian who came under fire for using the Chinese female pseudonym Yi-Fen Chou (allegedly the name of a classmate at WHS) 
Chuck Surack, entrepreneur, philanthropist, and musician; founder of Sweetwater Sound

See also
 List of high schools in Indiana

References

External links
Official website

Public high schools in Indiana
Schools in Fort Wayne, Indiana